A command paper is a document issued by the UK Government and presented to Parliament.

White papers, green papers, treaties, government responses, draft bills, reports from Royal Commissions, reports from independent inquiries and various government organisations can be released as command papers, so called because they are presented to Parliament formally "By His Majesty's Command".

Dissemination
Command papers are:
 produced by government departments
 printed on behalf of His Majesty's Stationery Office
 presented to Parliament "by Command of His Majesty" by the appropriate government minister
 recorded by the House of Commons and the House of Lords
 published by government departments on gov.uk
 subject to statutory legal deposit

Numbering
Command papers are numbered. Since 1870 they have been prefixed with an abbreviation of "command" which has changed over time to allow for new sequences.

See also
Office of Public Sector Information (OPSI)
Treaty series

References

External links
Command papers on GOV.UK
UK national government publications at the British Library

Collections of treaties
Government of the United Kingdom
Government reports
Documents of the United Kingdom